All the Way... A Decade of Song & Video is the sixth home video by Canadian singer Celine Dion, released on 20 February 2001. It is a collection of her English-language music videos and live performances, including nine signature singles and seven new tracks. The DVD/CD package containing also All the Way… A Decade of Song album was released on 22 September 2003. In February and March 2009, a Visual Milestones DVD edition was released in Europe and Australia.

Background
The classics include "My Heart Will Go On," "Because You Loved Me," "Beauty and the Beast" and "I'm Your Angel" (duet with R. Kelly). New tracks include a remake of the Roberta Flack classic, "The First Time Ever I Saw Your Face," "If Walls Could Talk," a Mutt Lange tune featuring background vocals by Shania Twain (this video wasn't available before), and "Then You Look at Me," title track from the Chris Columbus movie The Bicentennial Man which reunites James Horner and Dion. The DVD also includes a bonus video and other goodies.

"Beauty and the Beast," "Because You Loved Me" and "To Love You More" were taken from the Live in Memphis home video. "The First Time Ever I Saw Your Face" and "All the Way" were taken from Dion's 1999 CBS TV special.

All the Way... A Decade of Song & Video spent 47 weeks on the Top Music Video Chart in the United States, peaking at number 15. It was certified Platinum for selling 100,000 copies. But it is undercertified, because according to Nielsen SoundScan it has sold over 300,000 copies till May 2010, and should be 3× Platinum. All the Way... A Decade of Song & Video reached number 3 on the Australian Music DVD Chart and was certified 8× Platinum (120,000). It was also certified Platinum in the UK (50,000).

An extended version of All the Way… A Decade of Song & Video including six new videos was released as a part of the Ultimate Box in 2008 in Japan.

Track listing

Charts

Weekly charts

Year-end charts

Certifications

Release history

References

2001 video albums
Celine Dion video albums
Music video compilation albums